USS Muskegon may refer to the following ships operated by the United States Navy:

 , was a patrol frigate launched in July 1943 and scrapped in the late 1950s exact date unknown
 , is a large harbor tug launched in 1962 and currently in active service

United States Navy ship names